Andreas Christen (born 29 August 1989) is a retired international footballer from Liechtenstein, who last played for USV Eschen/Mauren.

Career
Christen has also played club football for FC Landquart-Herrschaft in Switzerland.

The defender left on 27 January 2012 his club USV Eschen/Mauren and joined to FC Balzers.

International 
He made his international debut for Liechtenstein in 2011.

Personal life 
He is the younger brother of Mathias Christen.

References

1989 births
Living people
Liechtenstein footballers
Liechtenstein international footballers
FC Balzers players
Association football defenders
People from Vaduz